The Twisted Logic Tour was the third concert tour undertaken by British rock band Coldplay. It was launched in support of their third studio album, X&Y (2005) on 15 June 2005, in Hamburg. Before the concert run, they embarked in a series of warm-up shows, which included their first performance at the Coachella Valley Music and Arts Festival and an appearance at the HFStival.  

Following the Australian and Asian legs, the band decided to rest for an extended period to produce Viva La Vida or Death and All His Friends (2008), concluding the tour with a Latin American run in 2007. It was the only concert run the band did not named after its promoted album: they chose a song which has never been played live.

Background
The Twisted Logic Tour is noted for its use of extravagant stage effects. Strobe lights and various other fixtures were used to create an elaborate light show.  The back of the stage contained a two-story panoramic video panel that displayed live footage and compute generated images, from video of a bear wandering aimlessly during "Talk" to a montage of coloured blocks from the cover of X&Y during the song "Clocks".

Other concert highlights include:
 A digital countdown display shown on the panoramic video screen during the song "Square One" as the band enter the stage. The timer reaches zero at the song's explosive first chorus, followed by the crowd getting showered by red, green, and blue strobe lighting.
 Chris Martin changing a lyric section of "Politik" into something related to the venue or a recent news event. For example, during their 2006 Toronto concert, Chris Martin changed the lyrics to "It's Thursday, March the 23rd, 2006, thank you for giving us your evening, and thanks for coming and being in our film". This line was made in reference to the fact that the concert was later featured in a made for television film. This was also done with the song "God Put a Smile Upon Your Face" in some shows.
 Confetti, and yellow balloons filled with gold glitter showered on the audience during the song "Yellow" (a homage to The Flaming Lips).
 During Coachella 2005 Martin sang the outro to "The Scientist" backwards, reminiscent of the song's music video. During much of the tour, the entire track was played backwards live, after the band had finished playing it regularly. The Charles and Ray Eames video "Powers of Ten" played in the background.
 Martin running into the crowd during "In My Place" to sing with the audience.
 Band members taking photographs before and during the show with disposable cameras before throwing them into the crowd. This was bassist Guy Berryman's idea, and was usually done during the reverse playing of "The Scientist".
 The band taking to the edge of the stage and performing an acoustic set of 2-3 of the following songs: "Til Kingdom Come", "Don't Panic", "Green Eyes", "Trouble" and/or a cover of Johnny Cash's "Ring of Fire" or Bob Dylan's "Simple Twist of Fate".
 Martin sometimes encouraging the audience to let their camera flashes off simultaneously as the band picks up during the bridge of "Talk", but also done during "Low" via a message on the main screen behind the band, resulting in a dramatic explosion of light. "Talk" also featured Martin taking an audience member's mobile phone and singing to the person on the other end, which was a common occurrence.
 Martin swinging a suspended lightbulb above his head after the second chorus of "Fix You", followed, in outdoor shows, by fireworks as the drum fill begins. This would later be featured in the song's music video.
 A laser light show during "Clocks", with red lasers shooting out in different directions. These were reintroduced during the second North American leg of the tour.
 A handwritten list of songs being projected toward the stage during "Swallowed in the Sea". This is presumably an early tracklist of songs during production of X&Y.
 The band gradually increasing the tempo of "Clocks" at the end of its regular performance, until it abruptly concludes at a ridiculously high tempo.
 During the Australian leg of the tour, the band made several references to the Socceroos in the 2006 FIFA World Cup by altering lyrics of the songs. On the second night of the Melbourne concerts and the final night of the Sydney concerts, the group performed the Kylie Minogue hit "Can't Get You Out of My Head" as a tribute to Australia and its music industry.
 At some concerts in Germany, Chris Martin asked the audience in German "Wo geht es zum Bahnhof?" ("How do you get to the train station?"). This may be a reference to the U2 song "Zoo Station".
 During performances of "White Shadows", thermal black and white imagery of the band performing appeared on the panoramic big screen. This was done in homage of the song title, as these kind of images can produce "white shadows" of heat producing sources.

During the tour, the band wore matching outfits consisting of black jackets, black trousers, and white shoes; of this, Chris Martin said: "There's great security in looking over at Jonny and seeing he's wearing the same coloured shoes as me. I suppose it's the same reason the army wears a uniform - so that you feel part of a clan. And when we're all dressed that way, I just feel very much like, it's OK, coz I'm part of this team."

Opening acts
Most of the tour included at least one supporting act on each concert, with English singer Richard Ashcroft opening all the German, Dutch, and Italian performances of the first European leg. He was accompanied by Kettcar, Tomte, and Vertigo in selected dates. Morning Runner became the main guest in Ireland and the United Kingdom, while Interpol (22–27 June), Supergrass (28 June to 2 July), Elbow (4 July) and Doves (5 July) featured as additional supports. The first North American leg had Black Mountain until 26 August, as Rilo Kiley took over the remaining dates. For the second European run, Coldplay invited Goldfrapp (mainland) and Ashcroft (United Kingdom). The latter returned in the final North American leg after Fiona Apple played from 25 January to 5 March 2006. The rest of the tour saw the band visiting Asia, Oceania and Latin America: Youth Group opened in Australia, while Saiko, Brian Storming, Papas da Língua, Volován supported in Chile, Argentina, Brazil and Mexico, respectively.

Commercial performance
According to report from Pollstar, the concerts held during 2005 around the world have sold 608,441 tickets in total. Coldplay then made a second appearance on the company's year end chart in 2006 with 570,082 admissions sold. The North American shows have grossed $52.7 million from 1,068,531 tickets sold in 70 reported dates. In total, the tour grossed $105,775,572 from 2,051,923 tickets.

Video release
Footage was filmed at the Air Canada Centre in Toronto on 22 and 23 March 2006, but (despite having announced a DVD release in March) they have shown the concert in Canada on Much Music. The airing date was Thursday 14 December 2006 at 9 pm and replays occurred at midnight and 3:30 pm on Friday 15 December 2006. Footage has also been shown on Spanish television and HDNet and there are plans to air it in other, non-specified countries. Due to the lack of airplay on mainstream channels in many countries, the show has been heavily shared over the Internet.

Set list 

The Twisted Logic Tour's set list was heavily weighted towards tracks from X&Y, which was as expected because of the tour being in support and promotion of the album. The remaining material was mostly from A Rush of Blood to the Head with songs such as "Politik", "In My Place", "Clocks", and "The Scientist", and to a lesser extent "Don't Panic", "Yellow", and "Trouble" being the only holdovers from Parachutes played with regularity.  The only new song played on the tour was "How You See the World No. 2" which was from the "Help: A Day in the Life" benefit album. Earlier tours such as those in the Parachutes era debuted work-in-progress versions of tracks that would appear on A Rush of Blood to the Head. Likewise, Coldplay's newest compositions during the A Rush of Blood to the Head Tour such as "Gravity", and "Proof" were included as B-sides to X&Ys singles.

The introductory music played at the start of each concert was either Brand Nubian's "Meaning of the 5%" or "Tomorrow Never Knows" by The Beatles. The closing music is "Good Night" by The Beatles. The following is a sample setlist of a concert at the Verizon Wireless Amphitheater in Bonner Springs, Kansas, United States. The major changes to this set for the other tour dates mainly saw "X&Y" and "Low"  performed in lieu of "What If", and "Swallowed in the Sea", respectively; Often, variations of these songs being played with one another occurred, such as "What If" and "Low". Also, "Parachutes" was often performed between "Yellow" and "Speed of Sound", and "Green Eyes" was sometimes added to the B-stage set. 

 "Square One"
 "Politik"
 "Yellow"
"God Put a Smile upon Your Face"
 "Speed of Sound"
 "Low"
"Warning Sign"
 "Everything's Not Lost"
 "White Shadows"
 "The Scientist"
 "Til Kingdom Come"
 "Don't Panic"
 "Clocks"
 "Talk"
 "Swallowed in the Sea"
 "In My Place"
 "Fix You"

Tour dates

Cancelled shows

Boxscore

Personnel
Credits taken from the band's official tour book, which was sold exclusively on merchandise booths and their online store.

Performing members
 Chris Martin – lead vocals, piano, rhythm guitar
 Jonny Buckland – lead guitar, backing vocals, keyboards
 Guy Berryman – bass, backing vocals, keyboards, percussion
 Will Champion – drums, backing vocals, percussion

Main crew
 Dave Holmes, Estelle Wilkinson – manager
 Rina Silverman – Dave Holmes assistant
 Holly Tickett – Estelle Wilkinson assistant
 Andy Franks – tour manager
 Tom Golseth – tour accountant
 Vicki Taylor – band assistant
 Kelly Samuels – head of band securiy
 Geoff Sands – band security
 Dave White – venue security
 Dan Portanier – trainer
 Wayne Griggs – DJ
 Audrey Nugent – tour assistant
 Derek Fudge – production manager
 Steve Iredale – site coordinator
 Shari Weber – production assistant
 Dan Green – FoH engineer
 Bryan Leitch – show designer
 Nick Whitehouse – lighting director
 Alan Yates – video director
 Chris Wood – monitor engineer
 Eric Benbow – stage manager
 Craig Hope, Matt McGinn – backline technician
 Sean Buttery – drum technician
 Matt Miller – MIDI technician, tour documentor
 Tony Smith – CVE
 Rob Allan – FoH technician
 Stewart Kennett – monitor technician
 Tom James – drapage
 Arran Hopkins – LED technician
 Andy Bramley – vision mixer

Rigging
 Jim Allison (chief)
 Rueben Pinkney

Lighting
 Ben Holdsworth (chief)
 Tim Massey
 David Mathieson
 Iestyn Thomas
 Oli James
 Ivan Ellison

Camera
 Ruory MacPhee
 Mark Antoniuk

Sound technicians
 Nick David
 Rob Collett

Catering
 Heidi Varah – catering crew chief
 Ben Albertson – chef

Catering crew
 Pauline Austin
 Emma Jane MacDonald
 Dan Gamble
 Sharon Jackson

Merch
 Jeremy Joseph
 Dell Furano
 Rick Fish
 Don Hunt
 Pete Weber
 Eric Wagner
 Ken MacAlpine

Truck drivers
 John Burgess
 Matt Clark
 Paul Edwards
 Chris Helslop
 Tony Coolidge
 Dave Clark
 Richard Knock
 Mel Bonner

Bus drivers
 Tony Biddiscombe
 Paul Maynard
 Chris Cox

Van drivers
 Melanie Meglin
 Tanja Stuerglinger
 Harald Weber
 Vedran Banic
 Gunther Frank
 Ines Wauters

Suppliers
 Air Charters – aircraft charter
 Matt Snowball Music – anything at any time
 Stars and Cars – Europe artist transport
 Moorcrofts of London – UK artist transport
 Buses – Trathens Star-Riders
 Catering – Eat to the Beat
 EFM Management Ltd. – freight forwarder
 Robertson Taylor – insurance brokers
 LaserGrafix – LED screens
 Siyan – lighting
 Music Bank – rehearsals
 Publicity & Display – passes
 Pyrovision – pyrotechnics
 Tour Tech – sound
 John Henry's – storage
 Celebrity Protection – tour security
 The Appointment Group – travel
 Fly by Night – trucks
 Picture Works – video

Photography
 Kevin Westenberg – principal band photography
 Penny Howle – live band photography
 Size Creative – image retouching

Website
 Debs Wild – website
 Anthony Cauchi – webmaster

Tour book
 Kate Stretton – design
 Alan Hill – printing

Creative input
 Tim Crompton
 Phil Harvey
 Kate Weigert
 Jake Weigert
 Danny McNamara
 Al Martin
 a.b.a. Martin

Aircraft
 Lilp Rami – captain
 Pasi Koho – first officer
 Liisa Marsala – flight attendant

Others
 Karen Parker – Oxfam representative
 Phil Leech – GLD dressing room
 Steve Strange, Nicki Forestiero – X-Ray Touring
 Marty Diamond, Larry Webman – Little Big Man
 Lester Dales, Paul Makin – Dales Evans
 Gavin Maude, Chris Organ – Russells
 Shelley Lazaar, Sue Finn – SLO Ltd.
 Parlophone – record label
 Caroline Elleray, Ian Ramage – BMG Publishing

See also
 List of Coldplay live performances
 List of highest-grossing live music artists

Notes

References

External links

Coldplay Official Website

2005 concert tours
2006 concert tours
2007 concert tours
Coldplay concert tours
Concert tours of Asia
Concert tours of Australia
Concert tours of Austria
Concert tours of Belgium
Concert tours of Canada
Concert tours of Denmark
Concert tours of Europe
Concert tours of France
Concert tours of Germany
Concert tours of Hong Kong
Concert tours of Italy
Concert tours of Ireland
Concert tours of Japan
Concert tours of Mexico
Concert tours of Norway
Concert tours of North America
Concert tours of Oceania
Concert tours of Portugal
Concert tours of Singapore
Concert tours of South America
Concert tours of Spain
Concert tours of Sweden
Concert tours of Switzerland
Concert tours of the Netherlands
Concert tours of the United Kingdom
Concert tours of the United States